John Mason Parker (June 14, 1805 – December 16, 1873) was an American Congressman from New York's 27th congressional district.

Biography
John M. Parker was born in Granville, New York on June 14, 1805.  He  attended Granville Academy and Castleton Seminary, graduated from Middlebury College in 1828, studied law, and began a practice in Owego, New York in 1833.

In 1854 Parker was elected to Congress as an Opposition Party candidate, and he was reelected as a Republican in 1856, serving from March 4, 1855 to March 3, 1859.

Parker was not a candidate for renomination in 1858.  In 1859 he became a Justice of the New York Supreme Court, where he served until his death.  During his time on the bench, Parker also sat as a Judge on the New York Court of Appeals.

He was a charter trustee of Cornell University from 1865 to 1870.

He died in Owego on December 16, 1873 and was buried in Owego's Evergreen Cemetery.

References

External links

1805 births
1873 deaths
People from Granville, New York
Opposition Party members of the United States House of Representatives from New York (state)
Republican Party members of the United States House of Representatives from New York (state)
People from Owego, New York
New York Supreme Court Justices
Judges of the New York Court of Appeals
Middlebury College alumni
19th-century American politicians
19th-century American judges